Monica Enlid  (born 24 April 1973) is a Norwegian footballer who played as a midfielder for the Norway women's national football team. She was part of the team at the UEFA Women's Euro 1995. On club level she played for Trondheims-Ørn in Norway.

References

External links
 

1973 births
Living people
Norwegian women's footballers
Norway women's international footballers
Place of birth missing (living people)
Women's association football midfielders